The NWA Central States Television Championship was the secondary singles championship for the Heart of America Sports Attractions / Central States Wrestling promotion from 1977 until the promotion ceased to exist in 1988. Because the championship is a professional wrestling championship, it is not won or lost competitively but instead by the decision of the bookers of a wrestling promotion. The championship is awarded after the chosen team "wins" a match to maintain the illusion that professional wrestling is a competitive sport.

Title History

Reigns by combined length
Key

Footnotes

References
General references

Specific references

See also
National Wrestling Alliance
Central States Wrestling

Heart of America Sports Attractions championships
National Wrestling Alliance championships
Television wrestling championships
Regional professional wrestling championships